Richard Ballantyne (August 26, 1817 – November 8, 1898) was the founder of the Sunday School of the Church of Jesus Christ of Latter-day Saints, having begun the program in December 1849. He was also a Mormon pioneer and missionary.

Ballantyne was born in Whitridgebog, Roxburghshire, Scotland, where he was a Sunday school teacher in the Relief Presbyterian Church. In December 1842, Ballantyne became a member of the Church of Jesus Christ of Latter Day Saints, being baptized in the Firth of Forth at Leith. In 1843 he and a number of his family members emigrated to Nauvoo, Illinois, where the majority of the Latter Day Saints were gathering. On February 17, 1847, Ballantyne married Hulda Meriah Clark, and they emigrated to Utah Territory in 1848 with the Mormon pioneers.

While living in Salt Lake City, Ballantyne asked for permission from his bishop to establish a Sunday school for some of the Latter-day Saint children. Having been granted permission, he held the first Church Sunday School meeting in his home on December 9, 1849. Approximately 50 students were in attendance. Sunday School was organized church-wide in 1867.

In 1852, Ballantyne was called to serve a church mission to India. He worked there with little success from 1853 to 1855.

Like many early Latter-day Saints, Ballantyne practiced plural marriage. He married Huldah M. Clark in 1847, Mary Pierce in 1855, and Caroline Sanderson in 1857 He was the father of 23 children. His sister Jane was a plural wife of John Taylor, who was president of the Church from 1880 to 1887.

See also
Aurelia Spencer Rogers
Hugh Findlay

Notes

References
 
 Conway B. Sonne (1949). Knight of the Kingdom: The Story of Richard Ballantyne (Salt Lake City, Utah: Deseret Book)
 Latter-Day Saint biographical encyclopedia: a compilation of biographical sketches of prominent men and women in the Church of Jesus Christ of Latter-Day Saints, Volume 1, page 703

External links

1817 births
1898 deaths
19th-century Mormon missionaries
American Latter Day Saints
British Latter Day Saints
Converts to Mormonism from Presbyterianism
Mormon missionaries in India
Mormon pioneers
People from the Scottish Borders
Scottish Latter Day Saints
Scottish Mormon missionaries
Scottish emigrants to the United States
Scottish expatriates in India
Scottish leaders of the Church of Jesus Christ of Latter-day Saints
Sunday School (LDS Church) people